Daniel M. Hausman (born March 27, 1947 in Chicago, Illinois) is an American philosopher. His research has focussed primarily on methodological, metaphysical, and ethical issues at the boundaries between economics and philosophy.  He is currently Herbert A. Simon Professor Emeritus in the Department of Philosophy at the University of Wisconsin–Madison.

Life and career
Hausman grew up in Chicago suburbs. He attended Harvard College, first majoring in biochemistry, then changing to English literature and history (B.A., magna cum laude, 1969). From there, he went to New York University for a Teaching degree (M.A.T., 1971), then on to study moral sciences at Cambridge University (B.A., 1973; M.A, 1977) and philosophy at Columbia University (M.Phil., 1975; Ph.D., 1978).

Hausman taught philosophy at the University of Maryland, College Park and Carnegie-Mellon University, before joining the faculty at Wisconsin in 1988.</ref>

Hausman was a founding co-editor (with  Michael McPherson) of the journal Economics and Philosophy,  which he co-edited for ten years from 1985. He has written or edited seven books and some 130  published papers. He is currently working on a book on preferences and on related questions concerning the measurement of health.  Along with Alexander Rosenberg, he is a philosophical critic of economics.

He was elected a Fellow of the American Academy of Arts and Sciences in 2009.

Selected publications
 Daniel M. Hausman, 1981. Capital, Profits, and Prices: An Essay in the Philosophy of Economics, Columbia. Chapter links (press clockwise-arrow and + buttons).
 _, 1989. "Economic Methodology in a Nutshell," Journal of Economic Perspectives, 3(2),  pp. 115-27.
 _, 1992a. Essays on Philosophy and Economic Methodology. Description,  ch. 1 link. Scroll to chapter-preview links.
 _, 1992b. The Inexact and Separate Science of Economics. Description, to ch. 1 link, preview, and review extracts 
 _, 1997. "Why Does Evidence Matter So Little to Economic Theory?" in Structures and Norms in Science, Maria L.D. Chiara et al., ed., pp. 395-407.
 _, 1998. Causal Asymmetries, Cambridge. Description and chapter-preview links.
 _, 2001. "Economics: Philosophy of," International Encyclopedia of the Social & Behavioral Sciences, v. 6, pp. 4159–65. Abstract.
 _, 2001. "Explanation and Diagnosis in Economics," Revue Internationale De Philosophie, 55, pp. 311–26. 
 _, 2003. "Philosophy of Economics," Stanford Encyclopedia of Philosophy
 _, [1984] 2007. The Philosophy of Economics: An Anthology, 3rd ed. Cambridge. Description & scroll to chapter-preview links.
 _, 2008. "Fairness and Social Norms," Philosophy of Science, 75(5), pp. 850–860. Abstract.
 _, 2009a. "Equality of Autonomy," Ethics, 119(4), p p. 742–756. 
 _, 2009b. "Benevolence, Justice, Well-Being and the Health Gradient," Public Health Ethics, 2(3), pp. 235–243. Abstract. 
 Daniel M. Hausman and Michael S. McPherson, [1994] 2006. Economic Analysis, Moral Philosophy, and Public Policy, 2nd ed. Cambridge.   Description and contents-preview link. 2008 Review.
 _, 2009. "Preference Satisfaction and Welfare Economics," Economics and Philosophy, 25 (1):1-25. Abstract.
 Daniel M. Hausman and Brynn Welch, 2010. "Debate: To Nudge or Not to Nudge," Journal of Political Philosophy, 18(1), pp.  123-136 (close Pages tab).

Awards
 May 23, 2015 - A day-long Conference was held to honor the work of Daniel M. Hausman by the Philosophy Department of the University of Wisconsin.

June 6, 2016 - Hausman received the Philosopher's Stone at the University of Bayreuth.

See also
 Philosophy and economics
 Economic methodology
 Normative economics
 Positive economics

References

External links
 Dan Hausman - University of Wisconsin–Madison Philosophy Department
 Daniel M. Hausman, Vita.
 Works by Daniel M. Hausman, Online Research in Philosophy.

1947 births
People from Chicago
20th-century American philosophers
Living people
Philosophers of science
Epistemologists
Metaphysicians
Harvard University alumni
University of Wisconsin–Madison faculty
Writers from Chicago
Writers from Wisconsin
Steinhardt School of Culture, Education, and Human Development alumni
Philosophers of economics